Gus Edward Zernial (June 27, 1923 – January 20, 2011) was an American professional baseball player. He played as an outfielder in Major League Baseball, most notably for the Philadelphia Athletics with whom he remained when they moved west and became the Kansas City Athletics in 1955. Nicknamed "Ozark Ike" after the popular comic strip character, Zernial was one of the most feared sluggers in the 1950s, joining Hall of Famers Mickey Mantle, Yogi Berra and Larry Doby in the American League for most home runs in the decade.

Professional career

Minor leagues 
Before being called up to the major leagues, Zernial played in the Pacific Coast League, the highly successful minor league circuit. In the HBO series When It Was a Game, Zernial states that he took a pay cut to come to the majors.

Major leagues 
After he hit 29 homers for the White Sox in 1950, Zernial was sent to the Athletics in a trade that brought Minnie Miñoso to Chicago in 1951. That year Zernial led the league in home runs (33), runs batted in (129), extra base hits (68), and outfield assists (17). In 1952 he hit 29 homers with 100 RBIs, and in 1953 he hit 42 home runs with 108 RBIs.

Zernial was the first major leaguer to hit four home runs in the month of October during the regular season, since 1900, which he accomplished during a doubleheader on October 1, 1950. Ron Kittle would become the second player to do this in 1985.

Zernial and Al Zarilla teamed up in April 1951 to become the only players whose last names started with "Z" to play together in the same outfield. Zernial and Zarilla played left and right field, respectively, as part of a White Sox outfield unit in four games before Zernial was traded to the Philadelphia A's at the end of April.

Sal Maglie, former star pitcher for the New York Giants, wrote that Zernial had a "pretty big" strike zone, due to his stand-up posture when he was at the plate.

Career overview 
An aggressive fielder, Zernial twice (1949 and 1954) broke his collarbone while making diving catches. He finished his career in Detroit, primarily as a pinch hitter, hitting .323 with 10 home runs in his new role.

Zernial was a career .265 hitter (1093-for-4131) with 237 home runs, 776 RBI, 572 runs, 159 doubles, 22 triples, 15 stolen bases and 383 bases on balls in 1234 games.

Zernial is featured in one of the most unusual baseball cards of all time. His 1952 Topps card shows Zernial holding a bat that has six baseballs attached to it. This photo recognized that he had tied an American League record by hitting six home runs in three consecutive games from May 13–16, 1951. The day after the picture was taken, he hit his seventh home run in a fourth consecutive game.

Zernial has the second most home runs of all time among players whose last name begins with the letter Z.  His 237 are second only to Todd Zeile who finished his career with 253.

Zernial was the first player to hit three home runs in the final game of a season, a record equalled by Dick Allen in 1968 and Evan Longoria and Dan Johnson in 2012.

In a postscript to his acclaim noted above as the "new DiMaggio", Zernial figured, coincidentally, in Joe DiMaggio meeting his legendary future wife Marilyn Monroe. The "handsome" young Zernial was chosen to pose with rising star Monroe in a movie-studio publicity shot. DiMaggio was so struck by Marilyn in the photo, as well as so envious of Zernial's opportunity, that he asked the rival outfielder how to reach Marilyn.

Later honors 
When the Oakland Athletics played the Philadelphia Phillies for the first time in interleague play in June 2003 at Veterans Stadium, the Phillies invited former Philadelphia A's Eddie Joost and Zernial to the games and recognized them prior to the first game.

Death 
Zernial was diagnosed with cancer in 1990. He died on January 20, 2011, from complications related to congestive heart failure.

See also 
 List of Major League Baseball career home run leaders
 List of Major League Baseball annual home run leaders
 List of Major League Baseball annual runs batted in leaders

Notes

External links

Gus Zernial - Baseballbiography.com

Major League Baseball left fielders
Chicago White Sox players
Philadelphia Athletics players
Kansas City Athletics players
Detroit Tigers players
American League All-Stars
American League home run champions
American League RBI champions
Waycross Bears players
Burlington Bees (Carolina League) players
Hollywood Stars players
Baltimore Orioles (IL) players
Baseball players from Texas
Sportspeople from Beaumont, Texas
1923 births
2011 deaths